KidZania is a Mexican privately held international chain of indoor family entertainment centers currently operating in 30 locations worldwide, allowing children to role play adult jobs and earn currency. It receives around 9 million visitors per year.

Overview

Every KidZania is themed as a child-sized replica of a real city, including buildings, shops and theaters, as well as vehicles and pedestrians moving along its streets. In this city, children aged 4 through 14, work in branded activities from bottling Coca-Cola, working in a Crest-sponsored dentist office, working at a McDonald's restaurant, painting with Corporação Industrial do Norte, washing hands with P&G's Safeguard soap, and using airline tickets from American Airlines, Fly Dubai and Saudia.

The children earn kidZos (KidZania's currency) while performing the tasks, and the money is kept in the KidZania bank for children to spend at the gift shop and on KidZania's activities. Inside every KidZania facility around the world, children wear electronic bracelets that allow parents to keep track of their kids remotely.

Bollywood actor Shah Rukh Khan owns a 26% share in KidZania India and helps promote the brand in India.

History 
KidZania was created and developed by the Mexican entrepreneur Xavier López Ancona, the current KidZania CEO. The first KidZania opened in September 1999 in Santa Fe Shopping Mall in Mexico City, and was named La Ciudad de los Niños ("The City of the Children").

Corporate sponsors funded 55% of the initial investment.

In 2007, KidZania hired entertainment strategist Andrew Darrow as executive vice president. Cammie Dunaway joined in late 2010 as the chief marketing officer.

KidZania at Westfield London, cost £20 million to build. In partnership with British Airways, it is operated by Joel Cadbury and Ollie Vigors through their Longshot Ltd company.

KidZania characters
The mascots of KidZania are called the RightZKeepers. According to the site’s story: They represent the rights that all KidZania patrons have, and together, they share an extra sixth right, the Right to Be.

The following are the mascots that KidZania has adopted overtime:
Urbano (Right to Know): A 9-year-old, green-haired kid who is ingenious, inquisitive, and adventurous. He is interested in conducting experiments and making inventions. (Appeared since 1999)
Vita (Right to Care): Urbano's younger sister, a kind and thoughtful blue-haired girl who loves all living things. (Appeared since 1999)
Bache (Right to Play): Urbano and Vita's blue pet dog. He loves to play, and will eat anything. His dream is to make sure every kid in the world is as happy as he is. (Appeared since 1999)
Beebop (Right to Create): Urbano's 10-year-old best friend. He is a huge fan of music and is very artistic. He has orange hair, and wears a yellow shirt and headphones. (Appeared since 2012)
Chika (Right to Share): The fashionista of KidZania, a sociable and cheerful pink-haired girl who wears fake cat ears. She gets her inspiration from her favorite anime and manga characters. (Appeared since 2012)
Bekha (Right to Be): An 11-year-old dark blue-haired girl who according to the story: shows the power to be self-determining, unique and free in harmony among humankind. This Right is grounded in the eternal idea of freedom: the power to act, speak and think as one wants without hindrance or restraint. (Appeared since 2017)

Locations

Current locations

 KidZania Mexico City, opened in September 1997 as La Ciudad de los Niños, rebranded KidZania La Ciudad de los Niños
 KidZania Monterrey, opened in May 2006; includes a broadcasting experience co-branded with Multimedios Televisión, including live remotes with the network's programming
 KidZania Tokyo, opened in October 2006 (franchise) 
 KidZania Jakarta, opened in November 2007 (franchise) at Pacific Place Jakarta - 
 KidZania Koshien, opened in March 2009 (franchise) - 
 KidZania Lisbon, opened June 2009 (franchise)
 KidZania Dubai, opened January 2010 (franchise)
 KidZania Seoul, opened February 2010 (franchise)
 KidZania Kuala Lumpur, opened February 2012 (franchise)
 KidZania Santiago, opened May 2012 (franchise)
 KidZania Cuicuilco in Mexico City, opened June 2012
 KidZania Bangkok, opened March 2013 (franchise)
 KidZania Mumbai, opened April 2013 (franchise)
 KidZania Kuwait, opened June 2013 (franchise, by the Alshaya Group)
 KidZania Cairo, opened September 2013 (franchise)
 KidZania Turkey, Istanbul, opened February 2014 (franchise)
 KidZania Jeddah, opened January 2015 (franchise)
 KidZania São Paulo, opened January 2015 (franchise)
 KidZania London, opened June 2015 (franchise)
 KidZania Moscow, opened 28 January 2016 (franchise, by Innova) 
 KidZania Busan, South Korea, opened in April 2016. This is the second KidZania location in South Korea.
 KidZania Delhi NCR, in Noida India, opened in May 2016. This is the second Kidzania location in India. The first being in Mumbai.
 KidZania Guadalajara, opened November 2018
 KidZania Doha, Qatar, opened May 2019
 KidZania Abu Dhabi, opened June 2019 at Yas Mall - 
 KidZania Johannesburg, opened 2019
 KidZania Dallas, opened November 2019 Stonebriar Centre in Frisco, Texas (franchise, by Innova)
 KidZania Surabaya, opened 12 December 2020 (franchise) – 
 Kidzania Fukuoka, opened August 2022 (franchise)

Upcoming locations 
 KidZania Toronto, is scheduled to open in 2022
 KidZania Paris, is scheduled to open in 2022 (by Innova)
 KidZania Chicago, opening 2022 at Oakbrook Center in Oak Brook, Illinois (franchise, by Innova)
 KidZania New York, opening 2022 at American Dream Meadowlands in East Rutherford, New Jersey (franchise, by Innova)
KidZania Los Angeles, is scheduled to open in 2022 (franchise, by Innova)
KidZania Pittsburgh, is scheduled to open in 2022 at Mall at Robinson
KidZania Hong Kong, is scheduled to open at 11 SKIES in 2023
KidZania Atlanta
KidZania Taipei
KidZania Giza
KidZania Amman
KidZania Riyadh

Former locations
 KidZania Singapore, opened April 2016 (franchise) - Closed June 2020.

 KidZania Manila, opened August 2015 (franchise, by ABS-CBN) - Closed August 31, 2020. Arguably one of the most popular KidZania parks until its closure.

 Kidzania Costa Rica, opened December 2018 (franchise) - Closed July 2021. This was arguably KidZania’s most short-living franchise, operating only for 2 years. The park fell into recession since June 2020, until it finally closed in July 2021.

Awards and recognition 
KidZania was voted the World's Top Family Entertainment Center by the IAAPA (International Association of Amusement Parks and Attractions) and 2009 Global Leisure Operator of the Year.

From 2011 to 2015, KidZania has been recognized as one of The Best Mexican Companies (Las Mejores Empresas Mexicanas), a recognition promoted by Banamex, Deloitte México and Tecnológico de Monterrey.

Gallery

References

External links

 
 An article about KidZania in the Japanese Metropolis magazine
 New Kidzania theme park to be developed – The Brunei Times
 Las Mejores Empresas Mexicanas (The Best Mexican Companies)

 
Tourist attractions in Mexico
1999 establishments in Mexico